Erik Hummel (born September 23, 1987) is an American former soccer player who played as a midfielder.

Career

Hummel started his career with American fourth tier side Orange County Blue Star. In 2007, Hummel signed for Austria Wien II in the Austrian second tier after almost signing for Dutch top flight side NAC, where he made 10 league appearances and scored 0 goals. On August 3, 2007, he debuted for Austria Wien II during a 2–2 draw with Kapfenberg. In 2008, Hummel signed for Halesowen Town in the English seventh tier.

References

External links
 

1987 births
2. Liga (Austria) players
American expatriate soccer players
American expatriate sportspeople in Austria
American expatriate sportspeople in England
American people of Italian descent
American soccer players
Association football midfielders
Expatriate footballers in Austria
Expatriate footballers in England
Halesowen Town F.C. players
Orange County Blue Star players
USL League Two players
Wake Forest Demon Deacons men's soccer players
Living people
Soccer players from New York City